This list of current cities, boroughs, townships, unincorporated communities, counties, and other recognized places in the U.S. state of Pennsylvania also includes information on the number and names of counties in which the place lies, and its lower and upper zip code bounds, if applicable.

See also
List of counties in Pennsylvania
List of census-designated places in Pennsylvania
List of cities in Pennsylvania
List of towns and boroughs in Pennsylvania
List of townships in Pennsylvania
List of enclaves in Pennsylvania

References

USGS Fips55 database